Carl L. Faingold, Ph.D. is a neuroscientist,   a Distinguished Professor in the Department of Pharmacology of Southern Illinois University School of Medicine in Springfield, Illinois;  he is a founding faculty member of both the department and the School of Medicine.  He has had an extensive career as a medical and graduate student educator as well as a researcher into brain mechanisms.   He is a specialist in the actions of drugs on brain activity at the level of the single neuron as it relates to networks of neurons in awake behaving animals.

Education

Faingold received his B.S. in Pharmacy from   the University of Illinois at Chicago in 1965,   and a Ph.D. in pharmacology  from Northwestern University in 1970. This was followed by a post-doctoral fellowship at the University of Missouri Institute of Psychiatry.   He is a long-time member of the American Society for Pharmacology and Experimental Therapeutics ASPET, the Research Society on Alcoholism RSA, the American Epilepsy Society (AES), and the Society for Neuroscience (SfN).

Research Interests

A current major research direction in Dr. Faingold’s lab is in the area of sudden unexpected death in epilepsy (SUDEP), which is a devastating and relatively rare problem that can occur in patients with epilepsy.  Th Since first publishing about a mouse model of SUDEP in 2007 in DBA mice, His lab has explored the role of brain chemicals, serotonin and adenosine, in potential preventative treatments for SUDEP in these mice, including a possible role of agents that enhance the action of serotonin in SUDEP prevention.  These agents include selective serotonin reuptake inhibitors (SSRIs) which prevent SUDEP in mice with some evidence of potential usefulness in human epileptic patients as well.

His lab has published several recent papers on the subject of SUDEP prevention in two mouse models of SUDEP in DBA/1 and DBA/2 mice.

Publications

He has participated in the writing of the "AMSPC Knowledge Objectives in Pharmacology" as co-editor with Richard Eisenberg, . of the  2012 update and expansion of these pharmacology teaching objectives.  He also served as co-editor of  Brody’s Human Pharmacology]  with   Lynn Wecker, George Dunaway, Lynn Crespo and Stephanie Watts.

Faingold has recently (2014) published a book with co-editor, Hal Blumenfeld, Professor of Neurology, Neuroscience and Neurosurgery at Yale University School of Medicine.Neuronal Networks in Brain Function, CNS Disorders, and Therapeutics

Awards
Faingold was named Distinguished Scholar of the   Southern Illinois University system in 2009.

Further reading

 Uteshev, V.V., S. Tupal, Y. Mhaskar, and C. L. Faingold. Abnormal serotonin receptor expression in DBA/2 mice associated with susceptibility to sudden death due to respiratory arrest. Epilepsy Res. 88, pp. 183–188, 2010
 Faingold, C.L., Tupal, S. and Randall, M. Prevention of seizure-induced sudden death in a chronic SUDEP model by semichronic administration of a selective serotonin reuptake inhibitor. Epilepsy Behav., 22:186-190, 2011.
 Faingold, C.L., Randall, M. Mhaskar, Y. and Uteshev, V. V.. Differences in serotonin receptor expression in the brainstem may explain the differential ability of a serotonin agonist to block seizure-induced sudden death in DBA/2 vs. DBA/1 mice. Brain Res., 1418:104-110, 2011.
 Faingold CL, Tupal S, Mhaskar Y, Uteshev VV.  DBA mice as models of sudden unexpected death in epilepsy.  IN:  Sudden Death in Epilepsy: Forensic and Clinical Issue, (C. Lathers, P. Schraeder, M. Bungo, J. Leestma, editors), Taylor and Francis, 657-674, 2010.
 Faingold CL. Brainstem networks: reticulo-cortical synchronization in generalized convulsive seizures. In: Noebels JL, Avoli M, Rogawski MA, Olsen RW, Delgado-Escueta AV, eds. Jasper's Basic Mechanisms of the Epilepsies. 4th ed. New York, NY: Oxford University Press, 2012: 257-271. Bethesda (MD): National Center for Biotechnology Information (US). Available from: http://preview.ncbi.nlm.nih.gov/books/NBK82044/.
 Feng, H.J., Faingold, C.L. Ketamine in mood disorders and epilepsy. In: Costa A and Villalba E, eds. Horizons in Neuroscience Research, Vol. 10. P. 103-122, Nova Science Publishers, New York, 2013.

References

External links
Faculty page at SIU

Year of birth missing (living people)
Living people
Southern Illinois University faculty
University of Illinois Chicago alumni
Northwestern University alumni
American neuroscientists